Gay Bar: Why We Went Out is a 2021 creative nonfiction book by Asian-American essayist Jeremy Atherton Lin published by Little, Brown in North America and Granta in the United Kingdom. It is a response to LGBT venue closures  written in the idiom of cultural memoir.

Gay Bar was listed among the Times Critics' Top Books of the Year in The New York Times. It received the National Book Critics Circle Award for Autobiography. It was shortlisted for the Randy Shilts Award.

Atherton Lin created a show for NTS Radio based on the book.

References 

2021 non-fiction books
2020s LGBT literature
LGBT non-fiction books
Little, Brown and Company books
Granta Books books